Denisse Peña Molina (born 19 November 1999 in Madrid) is a Spanish actress. She has appeared in the Spanish drama-thriller television series El Internado and the Spanish police drama Servir y proteger.

Biography 
Denisse Peña Molina's first acting role was in a Toys "R" Us commercial when she was a child. In subsequent years, she continued to appear in various commercials. However, her first significant role was that of Evelyn Pons in the series , which aired between 2007 and 2010 on the Spanish TV channel Antena 3. Also in 2010, she appeared in the short film 2 metros cuadrados.

In 2014 she played Daniela in the series Bienvenidos al Lolita, also on Antena 3, and appeared in the movie , alongside Patricia Conde and Iván Massagué.

In October 2014, she received a best actress award for the short film  at Cineculpable, an international film festival in Vila-real. In November 2015, she received another best actress award for the same film at a short film festival in Paracuellos de Jarama.

In 2017 she announced her involvement in several episodes of a new television series on La 1, in the role of Patricia. Two years and more than 400 episodes later, she left the series in the middle of its third season. Starting in February 2020, she returned to the series.

In 2019 she signed on to the series Néboa in the role of Ana Galmán alongside Emma Suárez and Nancho Novo. In June of the same year she also signed on to the fifth and final season of the series Las chicas del cable (Cable Girls), which was released on Netflix. She played the role of Sofía, the daughter of Ángeles (Maggie Civantos) and Mario (Sergio Mur).

Filmography

Television

Films

Short films

References
 

1999 births
Living people
Actresses from Madrid
Spanish television actresses
21st-century Spanish actresses